Elina Maria Valtonen (former Lepomäki) (born 23 October 1981 in Helsinki) is a Finnish politician. A member of the National Coalition Party, she has represented the constituency of Uusimaa in the Parliament of Finland since July 2014. In the municipal election 2021 she collected the second highest number of votes and was elected a member of the City Council of Helsinki. 

As a child, Valtonen lived with her family in Bonn, Germany, and completed A-levels (Reifeprüfung diploma) at the German School in Helsinki.

Valtonen holds a master's degree in both technology and financial economics from Helsinki University of Technology and Helsinki School of Economics. She is an owner in several technology start-ups and Chair of the Board in the free-market think tank Libera.

Prior to entering politics in 2014, Valtonen spent 10 years in investment banking, as Director at Royal Bank of Scotland and as senior analyst at Nordea. She has developed a model for transforming the welfare state into a digital sharing economy, called the Life Account. In 2018, she participated in the Bilderberg Conference in Turin.

In April 2016, Valtonen announced her candidature for the leadership of the National Coalition Party. In the first round of the leadership election on 11 June 2016 she received 15 percent of the votes and was not elected.

In September 2020 Valtonen was elected as a new vice chairman of the Coalition Party.

Valtonen has co-authored several reports on economics and the society such as "The Future of the Euro - The alternatives for Finland" (2014) and "The Life Account - A Social Security Reform" (2013). In 2018, she published her book Vapauden Voitto (“Victory of Freedom”, Otava), on how to reform the Nordic welfare model and the European Union.

In September 2020, Valtonen filed for divorce from Jukka Lepomäki, and in April 2021 she announced that she changed her surname back to her maiden name. Valtonen and Lepomäki have two children together.

References

External links 

 Official website
 Lepomäki on the website of the Parliament

1981 births
Living people
Politicians from Helsinki
National Coalition Party politicians
Members of the Parliament of Finland (2011–15)
Members of the Parliament of Finland (2015–19)
Members of the Parliament of Finland (2019–23)
21st-century Finnish women politicians